Core Evidence is a peer-reviewed healthcare journal covering research on drug development. The journal was established in 2005 and is published by Dove Medical Press.

External links 
 

English-language journals
Open access journals
Dove Medical Press academic journals
Pharmacology journals
Publications established in 2005